The Warmington baronetcy, of Pembridge Square in the Royal Borough of Kensington, is a title in the Baronetage of the United Kingdom. It was created on 28 July 1908 for Marshall Warmington, Liberal Member of Parliament for West Monmouthshire from 1885 to 1895.

Warmington baronets, of Pembridge Square (1908)
Sir Cornelius Marshall Warmington, 1st Baronet (1842–1908)
Sir (Marshall) Denham Warmington, 2nd Baronet (1871–1935)
Sir Marshall George Clitheroe Warmington, 3rd Baronet (1910–1995)
Sir Marshall Denham Malcolm Warmington, 4th Baronet (1934–1996)
Sir David Marshall Warmington, 5th Baronet (1944–2005)
Sir Rupert Marshall Warmington, 6th Baronet (born 1969)

Notes

References
Kidd, Charles, Williamson, David (editors). Debrett's Peerage and Baronetage (1990 edition). New York: St Martin's Press, 1990, 

Warmington